Puerto Rico Highway 133 (PR-133) is a major access road in Ponce, Puerto Rico. The road is 1.2 miles long and consists of three segments called (moving eastward) "Calle Comercio" (a.k.a. "Calle Francisco Parra Duperón"), "Avenida Cuatro Calles", and "Avenida Ednita Nazario".  The road has both of its endpoints, as well as its entire length, within the Ponce city limits. It runs west to east. The road is a main access road from downtown Ponce to PR-1, providing access to Guayama and all other points in the eastern portion of the Puerto Rico, and to PR-52, which provides expressway access to San Juan.

Route description
Highway 133 is 1.2 miles long, making it one of Puerto Rico's shortest primary roads.

Calle Comercio
The road starts at its intersection with Calle Marina (PR-123) at Plaza Las Delicias in downtown Ponce ("Ponce Centro"). From this point the road runs east for three blocks as a one-lane, one-way street and is called Francisco Parra Duperón but it is popularly known as Calle Comercio. At the end of the third block, the road intersects Cruz Street and becomes a two-lane, two-way street. The road runs as a two-way street until its intersection with Río Portugués. Parque de la Ceiba is on the north side of the road at this point.

Avenida Cuatro Calles
After crossing Rio Portugués the road is called Avenida Cuatro Calles. The road crosses PR-12 via an underpass (no access to PR-12 at this point) and continues to run in a westerly direction, intersecting with PR-163/Avenida Las Américas at Café Rico, near Centro del Sur Mall.

Avenida Ednita Nazario
After crossing Avenida Las Americas the road becomes a 4-lane roadway known as Avenida Ednita Nazario. The former headquarters of Rovira Biscuits Corporation are located on the north side of the road in this section. A public art display consisting of the bust of Ednita Nazario is located at easternmost end of this section of PR-133, on the north side of the road. PR-133 ends at its intersection with the PR-2/PR-1/Miguel Pou Boulevard complex. (Continuing straight east the roadway is six lanes wide and it is a section of Eastbound PR-1 known as "Avenida La Ceiba".)

Landmarks
Landmarks along this road include Ceiba Tree Park, located next to Río Portugués, Cafe Rico, and Rovira Biscuits Corporation. A monument to Ednita Nazario is located at the northwest corner of PR-133 and PR-2.

Major intersections

See also

 List of highways in Ponce, Puerto Rico
 List of highways numbered 133
 List of streets in Ponce, Puerto Rico

Notes

References

External links

 Historia de las Carreteras de Puerto Rico. Retrieved March 11, 2010. 
 Roads in Porto Rico. By Manuel Victor Domenech (Former Commissioner of the Interior), in The Overland Monthly. Vol 73, No, 4; April, 1919. Page 321. Retrieved March 11, 2010.
 Guía de Carreteras Principales, Expresos y Autopistas 

133
Roads in Ponce, Puerto Rico